Cloquet is a city in Carlton County, Minnesota, United States, at the junction of Interstate 35 and Minnesota State Highway 33. Part of the city lies within the Fond du Lac Indian Reservation and serves as one of the reservation's three administrative centers. The population was 12,568 at the 2020 census.

History

Cloquet began as a group of small settlements around three sawmills: Shaw Town, Nelson Town, and Johnson Town. These became known as Knife Falls after a local waterfall over sharp slate rocks, and later as Cloquet. The Ojibwe in the area called the area Mookomaan-onigamiing, meaning "At the Knife Portage", as the portage to avoid Knife Falls connected the three communities. The area was platted in 1883 and the village of Cloquet was incorporated from the three settlements in 1884. It became a city with a mayor and city council in 1904. The word "Cloquet" first appeared on an 1843 map of the area by Joseph N. Nicollet, which named the Cloquet River, a tributary of the Saint Louis River, and the Cloquet Rapids to the north. "Cloquet" is a French surname, but historians have found no source for it. Some speculate that the river was named for the 19th-century French scientists Hippolyte and Jules Cloquet, and the settlement named for the river.

The area was the site of the 1918 Cloquet Fire, which destroyed much of the town and killed approximately 500 people.

Cloquet is famed in American economic history because before and after World War II it was home of the nation's strongest consumers cooperatives. The Cloquet Coöperative Society (founded in 1910) operated two cooperative stores, which handled food, hardware, shoes, dry goods, and furniture. Other cooperative services included a building supply store, a coal yard, a mortuary, an auto repair shop and a gas service station.

In 1939, the co-op did 35% of the business in the town, and 18% in Carlton County. By the mid-1950s, the consumer society had a membership of 4,262 out of a population of 8,500. This was a national record, given that the total business of all American co-ops combined represented only 0.5% of the economy. The Finnish cooperative groups of the area also had an influence on the American cooperative movement in general.

In the 1970s the area of the city was increased to over ten times what it had been in 1970. Despite this, the population of the city still declined from 1970 to 1980, even as the number of separate residences increased.

Architecture
Cloquet is home to the R.W. Lindholm Service Station, the only gas station designed by architect Frank Lloyd Wright and a structure now on the National Register of Historic Places.

Geography

Cloquet is along the Saint Louis River, 20 miles southwest of Duluth.

Climate
Cloquet has a Humid continental climate (Köppen Climate Classification Dfb) typical of its location in northern Minnesota, with warm summers and long, cold winters.

Demographics

2020 census
As of the census of 2020, the population was 12,568. The racial makeup of the city was 80.0% White, 10.9% Native American, 0.8% Black or African American, 0.7% Asian, 0.1% Pacific Islander, 0.5% from other races, and 7.0% from two or more races. Ethnically, the population was 1.8% Hispanic or Latino of any race.

2010 census
As of the census of 2010, there were 12,124 people, 4,959 households, and 3,126 families residing in the city. The racial makeup of the city was 84.4% White, 0.4% African American, 10.8% Native American, 0.5% Asian, 0.1% from other races, and 3.7% from two or more races. Hispanic or Latino of any race were 1.3% of the population.

There were 4,959 households, of which 32.9% had children under the age of 18 living with them, 43.1% were married couples living together, 14.4% had a female householder with no husband present, 5.6% had a male householder with no wife present, and 37.0% were non-families. 30.5% of all households were made up of individuals, and 12.9% had someone living alone who was 65 years of age or older. The average household size was 2.40 and the average family size was 2.96.

The median age in the city was 37 years. 25.5% of residents were under the age of 18; 8.9% were between the ages of 18 and 24; 25.5% were from 25 to 44; 25% were from 45 to 64; and 15.2% were 65 years of age or older. The gender makeup of the city was 48.7% male and 51.3% female.

2000 census
As of the census of 2000, there were 11,201 people, 4,636 households, and 2,967 families residing in the city. The racial makeup of the city was 88.21% White, 0.16% African American, 9.35% Native American, 0.39% Asian, 0.01% Pacific Islander, 0.13% from other races, and 1.75% from two or more races. Hispanic or Latino of any race were 0.63% of the population. 16.0% were of German, 15.4% Finnish, 12.4% Norwegian, 9.8% Swedish and 6.1% Polish ancestry.

There were 4,636 households, out of which 30.8% had children under the age of 18 living with them, 47.1% were married couples living together, 12.4% had a female householder with no husband present, and 36.0% were non-families. 31.0% of all households were made up of individuals, and 14.6% had someone living alone who was 65 years of age or older. The average household size was 2.38 and the average family size was 2.96.

In the city, the population was spread out, with 25.6% under the age of 18, 8.5% from 18 to 24, 27.5% from 25 to 44, 21.4% from 45 to 64, and 16.8% who were 65 years of age or older. The median age was 38 years. For every 100 females, there were 89.9 males. For every 100 females age 18 and over, there were 86.1 males.

The median income for a household in the city was $35,675, and the median income for a family was $47,799. Males had a median income of $40,140 versus $26,144 for females. The per capita income for the city was $17,812. About 7.7% of families and 9.9% of the population were below the poverty line, including 9.7% of those under age 18 and 12.4% of those age 65 or over.

Infrastructure

Major highways
  Interstate 35
  Minnesota State Highway 33

Education
Most of Cloquet is zoned to Cloquet Public School District; small portions are zoned to Carlton Public School District.

There is a K-12 tribal school, Fond du Lac Ojibwe School, affiliated with the Bureau of Indian Education (BIE).

Notable people
 U.W. "Judge" Hella, director of Minnesota State Parks
 Jerry Knickerbocker, Minnesota state legislator and businessman
 Jessica Lange, actress
 Jamie Langenbrunner, former NHL player
 Clarence Larson, chemist, Commissioner, U.S. Atomic Energy Commission
 Corey Millen, former NHL player. Former head coach with Minnesota Wilderness
 Barbara Payton, actress
 Derek Plante, former NHL player. Currently an assistant coach with Minnesota-Duluth
 Roy W. Ranum, mayor of Cloquet and Minnesota state senator
 Daren Streblow, standup comedian
 Lawrence Yetka, Associate Justice of the Minnesota Supreme Court

References

Florence C. Parker, The First 125 Years. A History of Distributive and Service Cooperation in the United States, 1829-1954 (Superior WI: CLUSA, 1956).

External links

City of Cloquet, MN – Official Website
Cloquet Area Chamber of Commerce website

Cities in Carlton County, Minnesota
Cities in Minnesota
Populated places established in 1884
Fond du Lac Band of Lake Superior Chippewa
1884 establishments in Minnesota